

524001–524100 

|-bgcolor=#f2f2f2
| colspan=4 align=center | 
|}

524101–524200 

|-bgcolor=#f2f2f2
| colspan=4 align=center | 
|}

524201–524300 

|-bgcolor=#f2f2f2
| colspan=4 align=center | 
|}

524301–524400 

|-bgcolor=#f2f2f2
| colspan=4 align=center | 
|}

524401–524500 

|-bgcolor=#f2f2f2
| colspan=4 align=center | 
|}

524501–524600 

|-bgcolor=#f2f2f2
| colspan=4 align=center | 
|}

524601–524700 

|-id=607
| 524607 Davecarter ||  || David B. Carter (born 1952) retired after nearly 40 years of service as an Electronics Technician and CCD expert at the South African Astronomical Observatory. His work included support of the telescopes and facilities in Sutherland, as well as building new instruments (including for the Southern African Large Telescope). || 
|-id=638
| 524638 Kaffkamargit ||  || Margit Kaffka was a Hungarian poet and novelist. || 
|}

524701–524800 

|-bgcolor=#f2f2f2
| colspan=4 align=center | 
|}

524801–524900 

|-bgcolor=#f2f2f2
| colspan=4 align=center | 
|}

524901–525000 

|-bgcolor=#f2f2f2
| colspan=4 align=center | 
|}

References 

524001-525000